Avontuur is a town situated in the Garden Route District Municipality in the Western Cape province of South Africa. The town is located 13km south-east of Uniondale on an intersection of the R339 and R62 regional routes.

History
The name is Afrikaans for adventure; its origin, however, remains uncertain. The river from which the town takes its name was known in 1778.

See also
 Avontuur Railway
 Langkloof

References

Populated places in the George Local Municipality